Axos Bank is an American federally chartered savings and loan association and direct bank headquartered in San Diego, California.  It is the main consumer brand of Axos Financial.

Founded and headquartered in San Diego, California, Axos has offices in Los Angeles, California; Laguna Hills, California; Las Vegas, Nevada; Salt Lake City, Utah; Kansas City, Kansas; and Columbus, Ohio.

The bank has three branches located in San Diego, California; Las Vegas, Nevada; and Columbus, Ohio.

Axos Bank holds approximately $14 billion in assets and deposits and employs approximately 1100 people.

Axos Bank is federally chartered, regulated by the Office of the Comptroller of the Currency (OCC), and insured by the Federal Deposit Insurance Corporation (FDIC). It is a Better Business Bureau (BBB) accredited business.

History

Axos Bank was previously known as BofI Federal Bank until it rebranded in October 2018.

Axos Bank, formerly Bank of Internet USA, was founded in 1999 by Jerry Englert, the founder of Bank of Del Mar, and Gary Lewis Evans, who was president of La Jolla Bank at the time. The bank was among the first digital banks in the world. The bank's holding company, BofI Holding, Inc., was incorporated in the state of Delaware in July 1999 for the stated purpose of organizing and opening an Internet-based bank. The opening day of the bank was on July 4 for three reasons. One, Mr Englert wanted its customers to realize that although traditionally July 4 is a bank holiday, people would still be able to access the bank due to its online format. Second, he wanted to pay homage to his oldest daughter's birthday. Finally, the theme of the bank "Independence from traditional banking" jibed with the holiday's history.

The bank was launched with $14 million in startup capital and was profitable within 14 months. The bank's thrift charter allowed it, and continues to allow it, to operate within all 50 states. The bank went public on NASDAQ as Bank of Internet USA on March 15, 2005. The number of employees running and managing the bank has grown from 35 in 2007 to 534 as of December 31, 2015.

In October 2011, Bank of Internet USA changed its name to BofI Federal Bank. However, BofI Federal Bank continued to use the Bank of Internet USA brand for its online consumer direct banking. The goal of Bank of Internet USA remained to provide banking services more cost-effectively by eliminating the overhead costs of branches. According to Andrew Micheletti, CFO and VP of BofI Holding, Inc., “We are taking advantage of the Internet for both efficiency in the back office and efficiency in the distribution and delivery of banking products.”

In April 2014, the bank purchased the bank unit of H&R Block. In 2018, the bank became the exclusive provider of H&R Block's refund anticipation loans.

Axos has been a supporter of the United States Navy SEAL Family Foundation since 2014.

From 2013 to the end of 2015, Bank of Internet USA saw a 327% growth in the number of savings deposits. Part of that growth may be attributed to Bank of Internet acquiring a portion of H&R Block's banking business in 2014, including 300,000 individual retirement accounts (IRAs).

In March 2018, the bank launched BOFI Realtor (Axos Realtor), a free mobile app that allows realtors to track the status of their clients' mortgages through the bank.

In April 2018, Axos Bank purchased the Chapter 7 business of the legal services company Epiq Systems Inc. This made Axos the second-largest company in the Chapter 7 bankruptcy and fiduciary services field.

In July 2018, the bank provided a $40 million loan for a synagogue conversion on the Upper West Side. The bank's services “have appealed to middle-market investors and luxury rental developers in Brooklyn’s ultra-Orthodox communities,” according to The Real Deal New York Real Estate News.

In 2018, the bank issued a $57 million construction loan to Bridgeton Holdings to complete its conversion of a Tribeca office building into the Walker Hotel.

In August 2018, Axos Bank's partnership with Nationwide began when Axos Financial announced its intention to acquire approximately $3 billion in deposits and 40,000 customers from Nationwide Bank. The acquisition received regulatory approval in September 2018 and was completed in November 2018. The two companies have an agreement to market to each other's customers.

In 2018, Bank of Internet USA provided Dr. Kanodia, a plastic surgeon, with a $180 million loan for his Spec house.

On October 1, 2018, BofI Federal Bank re-branded as Axos Bank, and switched its stock exchange from NASDAQ to the NYSE.

In October 2018, BofI Federal Bank official rebranded to Axos Bank.

In November 2018, Axos completed its acquisition of approximately $3 billion deposits and 40,000 customers from Nationwide Bank. Axos and Nationwide then entered into a joint-marketing relationship.

In December 2018, Axos signed an agreement to acquire the deposits of MWABank. The transaction closed in March 2019.

In July 2021, Axos announced net income of $215.7 million, up 20% year-over-year.

In February of 2022, Axos gave former President Donald Trump's company, The Trump Organization, a loan for $100 million to refinance the Trump Tower despite lacking solid financial reports after its accounting firm declined to back 10 years of financial statements that they produced for The Trump Organization.

References

Online banks
Banks based in California
Companies based in San Diego
American companies established in 1999
Banks established in 1999
1999 establishments in California